Deadly Illusions is a 2021 American erotic thriller film written and directed by Anna Elizabeth James and starring Kristin Davis, Dermot Mulroney, Greer Grammer, and Shanola Hampton.

Plot
Mary Morrison, a successful author of thriller novels, is happily married to Tom with two young children. Her publisher, asking her to write another book, offers a two million dollar advance; she initially declines but has to accept after Tom says he lost half of their estate on a risky investment. Mary's friend Elaine suggests hiring a nanny to help with the kids as she writes and, after a few interviews, she employs Grace.

Mary has writer's block and uses her blossoming friendship with Grace to inspire her. Mary then starts having what appears to be sexual fantasies about Grace. She also seems to dream about Grace and Tom engaging in sexual activity in the kitchen, but cannot tell if it is real or her vivid imagination. Confronting them both at the dinner table in a tearful rage, she upsets the children and causes a divide between her and Grace.

The following morning, Mary apologizes to Grace, saying her outburst was the result of working too hard. She then calls the nanny agency to ask why they haven't cashed her check yet, and they tell her it's because she hasn't gotten back to them about her choice of a nanny. Mary asks if they have a nanny called Grace in their service and they say no.

Mary goes to see Elaine and finds her dead with a pair of scissors in her neck. Contacting the police, to her surprise and horror, she learns she is the main suspect. The police reveal there is a great deal of incriminating evidence, including a video of what appears to be Mary arriving at Elaine's house, although her face is obscured with a headscarf and sunglasses, and her latest book has a murder with scissors.

Mary then travels to Grace's hometown, visiting her aunt, who reveals Grace had been abused by her parents as a child, and herself also exhibiting odd behavior. Mary calls Tom to warn him about Grace but he does not answer. At home, he is in the shower when Grace walks in dressed in lingerie and brandishing a large knife. She continuously switches from her usual sweet, soft-toned self to a violent seducer with a deep voice. As she attacks Tom, Mary arrives home. Grace claims to not know what happened, repeatedly saying, "I couldn't stop her." Grace suffers from dissociative identity disorder, and her other identity "Margaret" is who attacked Tom. Mary eventually knocks Grace unconscious.

One year later, Mary and her family are together. Mary takes the finished manuscript of her new book to Elaine's grave and leaves it there, as it was Elaine who encouraged her to start writing again. She then goes to visit Grace in a mental hospital. The film ends with "Mary" leaving the hospital, her face obscured by a headscarf and sunglasses, as in the police video of Elaine's killer.

Cast
 Kristin Davis as Mary Morrison
 Dermot Mulroney as Tom Morrison
 Greer Grammer as Grace
 Shanola Hampton as Elaine
 Marie Wagenman as Alex
 Shylo Molina as Sam
 Melissa Chambers as Grace's aunt
 Shaun Wu as Kioki
 Abella Bala as Darlene

Production
The film was shot in Albuquerque, New Mexico, in 2019.

Release
The film was released on March 18, 2021, by Netflix. It was the most-watched film on the platform in its first weekend.

Critical response 
On Rotten Tomatoes, the film holds an approval rating of 21% based on 14 reviews, with an average rating of 3.3/10. Rachel Willis of UK Film Review wrote, "This movie wants to keep us guessing, but it's never enticing enough to make much of an impact."

References

External links
 
 

2021 films
2021 LGBT-related films
2021 psychological thriller films
2020s American films
2020s English-language films
2020s erotic thriller films
American erotic thriller films
American LGBT-related films
American psychological thriller films
English-language Netflix original films
Female bisexuality in film
Films about writers
Films shot in New Mexico
Lesbian-related films
LGBT-related thriller films
Voltage Pictures films